Vernon Township, Ohio may refer to:

Vernon Township, Clinton County, Ohio
Vernon Township, Crawford County, Ohio
Vernon Township, Scioto County, Ohio
Vernon Township, Trumbull County, Ohio

See also
Vernon Township (disambiguation)

Ohio township disambiguation pages